= Speed limits in Albania =

Speed limits in Albania.

The general speed limits in Albania are as follows:

- 40 km/h (25 mph) within built-up areas;
- 80 km/h (50 mph) outside built-up areas;
- 90 km/h (56 mph) on expressways;
- 110 km/h (68 mph) on motorways.

== Special restrictions ==
Speed limits for certain vehicles are as follows:

- Mopeds: 45 km/h (28 mph).
- Vehicles transporting dangerous goods:

- 30 km/h (19 mph) within built-up areas;
- 50 km/h (31 mph) outside built-up areas.

- Vehicles towing vehicle:

- 20 km/h (12 mph) within built-up areas;
- 40 km/h (25 mph) outside built-up areas.

- Agricultural machinery:

- 15 km/h (9.3 mph) without pneumatic tires;
- 20 km/h (12 mph) within built-up areas;
- 40 km/h (25 mph) outside built-up areas.

- Trams:

- 30 km/h (19 mph) within built-up areas;
- 60 km/h (37 mph) outside built-up areas.

- Vehicles with trailers (excluding cars):

- 40 km/h (25 mph) within built-up areas;
- 60 km/h (37 mph) outside built-up areas;
- 70 km/h (43 mph) on motorways.

- Buses exceeding 8 metric tons (7.9 long tons; 8.8 short tons):

- 40 km/h (25 mph) within built-up areas;
- 70 km/h (43 mph) outside built-up areas;
- 90 km/h (56 mph) on motorways.

- Merchandise transport vehicles exceeding 3.5 metric tons (3.4 long tons; 3.9 short tons):

- 40 km/h (25 mph) within built-up areas;
- 60 km/h (37 mph) outside built-up areas;
- 70 km/h (43 mph) on expressways
- 80 km/h (50 mph) on motorways.

- Trucks transporting passengers exceeding 5 metric tons (4.9 long tons; 5.5 short tons):

- 40 km/h (25 mph) within built-up areas;
- 60 km/h (37 mph) outside built-up areas;
- 70 km/h (43 mph) on motorways.

- Transport and loading vehicle while loaded

- 30 km/h (19 mph) within built-up areas;
- 60 km/h (37 mph) outside built-up areas;
